The Rex Hotel Saigon  is a famous luxury and business hotel in Ho Chi Minh City, Vietnam.

The 286-room, five-story building is located in District 1 of the city, close to the Saigon Notre-Dame Basilica and the Municipal Theatre. In 2003, the hotel underwent extension and renovation works in its architecture, interior design and engineering services. It is owned by the state-owned enterprise Saigon Tourist.

History

Constructed in 1927, for French businessman Bainier, during France's colonial rule of Vietnam, the building started out as a two-story auto dealership and garage complex, called  "Bainier Auto Hall". The building showcased Citroën and other European cars. From 1959 to 1975, Mr. and Mrs. Ung Thi renovated the building into the 100-room "Rex Complex" hotel, which featured three cinemas, a cafeteria, a dance hall and a library.

The first guests in the Rex came in December 1961, while it was still in its final construction phase. They were 400 U.S. Army soldiers, 200 each from the 57th Transportation Company from Fort Lewis, Tacoma, Washington,  and the 8th Transportation Company from Fort Bragg, NC. They were the first company-strength units to arrive in Saigon, equipped with twenty H-21 twin rotor Shawnee helicopters, on the USS Core, on December 11, 1961. They were billeted at the Rex for a week or so while their tents were being set up at Tan Son Nhat for the 57th, and the 8th at Quy Nhon. A Thanksgiving dinner, held a few weeks after the actual holiday, was cooked in the men's field kitchen on the rooftop of the Rex.

During the Vietnam War, the hotel was the site of the United States military command's daily press conference, derisively named Five O'Clock Follies by cynical journalists who found the optimism of the American officers misguided. The daily event was hosted by Barry Zorthian, chief spokesperson for the U. S. government in Saigon from 1964-68. Its rooftop bar was a well-known hangout spot for military officials and war correspondents.

Decline and revival of the Rex 
After the Vietnam War ended in 1975, the state's Saigon Tourism Bureau took ownership of the hotel and renamed it Ben Thanh ("The City Port"). The hotel was used as the location for the press conference announcing the reunification of Vietnam in 1976. 

In 1986, the hotel was renamed Rex Hotel.

See also
 Hotel Metropole Hanoi
 Hotel Continental
 Hotel Majestic

References

External links 
 Official Website
 The hotel's history at the SaigonScene website
 Saigon hotel

Hotel buildings completed in 1927
Hotels in Ho Chi Minh City
Hotels established in 1959
1950s establishments in South Vietnam